Out of It may refer to:

"Out of It", 2010 song by Fallulah from The Black Cat Neighborhood
"Out of It", 2017 song by The Story So Far from Proper Dose
Out of It (film), a 1969 American comedy film directed by Paul Williams